The Ichirgu-boila or Chargobilya (Old Bulgarian:) was a high-ranking official in the First Bulgarian Empire. He was the commander of the garrison of the capital and was the third most important person in the state after the ruler and the Kavkhan. In peace-time the ichirgu-boila had diplomatic functions. According to some data the ichirgu-boila personally commanded a squad of 400 heavy cavalrymen.

Origin 

According to Veselin Besheliev the word "ichirgu" was of Turkic-Altay origin and meant "internal".

One funeral inscription found during excavation works in Preslav talks about the ichirgu-boila Mostich who served under the Emperors Simeon I the Great (893-927) and Peter I (927-969). An unknown ichirgu-boila is mentioned in the Philippi Inscription dating from the reign of Khan Presian I.

See also 
 Boila

Footnotes

External links 
 Музей Преслав — речник
 Прабългарски думи

First Bulgarian Empire
Bulgarian noble titles
Bulgar language